Samuel S. Lewis (February 17, 1874 – January 15, 1959) was the 17th lieutenant governor of Pennsylvania from 1939 to 1943.

Lewis was born in York, Pennsylvania.  He was elected Pennsylvania Auditor General in 1921 and then served as Pennsylvania Treasurer from 1925 through 1929. During the 1931-1935 administration of Gifford Pinchot, he was the Secretary of Highways and spearheaded the governor's ambitious rural transportation initiative. From 1951 through 1953, he was Governor John S. Fine's Secretary of Forests & Water. . There is a state park near York named after the former lieutenant governor.

External links
The Political Graveyard

1874 births
1959 deaths
Lieutenant Governors of Pennsylvania
Pennsylvania Auditors General
State treasurers of Pennsylvania
Politicians from York, Pennsylvania
Pennsylvania Republicans